Belalcázar may refer to:

 Belalcázar, Spain, a municipality in the province of Córdoba, southern Spain
 Castle of Belalcázar, a Gothic castle in the Spanish city
 Belalcázar, Caldas, a town and municipality in the Colombian department of Caldas
 Sebastián de Belalcázar (1479/80–1551), a Spanish conquistador
 Bréiner Belalcázar (born 1984), a Colombian footballer